Harry Louis Clifton (born 12 June 1998) is a professional footballer who plays as a midfielder and winger for  club Grimsby Town.

Club career

Grimsby Town
Clifton joined Grimsby Town as an under-10 and progressed through the club's youth system.

Clifton signed his first professional contract in July 2015. He joined NPL Premier Division side Grantham Town in September 2016, initially on a month's loan deal. After impressing in his initial loan, it was then extended another two months. After scoring 3 goals in 21 appearances, his loan was extended in December 2016 until the end of the 2016–17 season. Clifton made 47 appearances for them, scoring six goals. He returned to Grimsby in May 2017, signing another two-year deal.

Clifton made his full debut on 29 August 2017 in the EFL Trophy against Doncaster Rovers. He made his professional League Two debut on 30 January 2018, coming on as a 79th-minute substitute, in a 3–0 defeat at Yeovil Town. Clifton made his full league debut against Exeter City on 24 February.

He signed a new three-year contract with Grimsby in June 2018.

Clifton scored his first professional league goal on 27 November 2018, scoring an equaliser in the 33rd minute with a header, in a 5–2 win against Tranmere Rovers. Three days later, he scored Grimsby's second goal on 70-minutes in the FA Cup second round, racing through on goal scoring a follow-up after his initial shot was saved, in a 2–0 victory against National League side Chesterfield.

Clifton played the full 120 minutes of the 2022 National League play-off Final as Grimsby beat Solihull Moors 2–1 at the London Stadium to return to the Football League.

On 24 June 2022, Clifton signed a new two-year deal with The Mariners.

International career 
Clifton was called up to the Wales Under-21's squad to join their training camp at the end of March 2019.

Career statistics

Honours
Grimsby Town
National League play-off winners: 2022

References

External links
Harry Clifton profile at the Grimsby Town F.C. website

1998 births
Living people
Footballers from Grimsby
English footballers
Welsh footballers
Association football midfielders
Grimsby Town F.C. players
Grantham Town F.C. players
Northern Premier League players
English Football League players